Kjell Magne Bondevik (born 3 September 1947) is a Norwegian Lutheran minister and politician. As leader of the Christian Democratic Party, he served as the 33rd prime minister of Norway from 1997 to 2000, and from 2001 to 2005, making him, after Erna Solberg, Norway's longest serving non-Labour Party prime minister since World War II. Currently, Bondevik is president of the Oslo Centre for Peace and Human Rights.

Family and early life
Bondevik was born in Molde, the son of Johannes Bondevik, a principal at the Christian folk high school Rauma folkehøyskole who also was a local politician for the Christian Democratic Party, and Margit, née Hæreid. He became a theological candidate from MF Norwegian School of Theology in 1975. Because Bondevik was active in Norwegian Politics at a young age, he did not serve in the military. In 1979 he was ordained as pastor in the (Lutheran) Church of Norway. He is married to Bjørg Bondevik (née Rasmussen) and has three children: Bjørn (born 1972), Hildegunn (born 1973) and John Harald (born 1976). Kjell Magne Bondevik is the nephew of politician Kjell Bondevik, the cousin of former bishop Odd Bondevik and brother in law of author and priest Eyvind Skeie.

Political career
In 2008, Bondevik said that he regards himself as a "68'er", and that he was "influenced by the radical wind of the time". While he remained in the movement of Young Christian Democrats (Norway, KrFU), he claims to have "radicalized the organization to great despair in the party". He has also said that he would likely rather have "oriented" himself towards the Socialist People's Party, had his radicalization of the Christian Democratic Party not gone through.

Representing the Christian Democratic Party, Bondevik was a member of the Storting (Parliament) from 1973 to 2005. He was his party's parliamentary leader in the periods of 1981–1983, 1986–1989, 1993–1997, 1997, and 2000–2001, and party leader from 1983 to 1995. In this position, he was succeeded by Valgerd Svarstad Haugland. He was also Minister of Foreign Affairs in Jan P. Syse's government of 1989–1990, Minister of Church and Education in Kåre Willoch's government 1983–1986, also Prime Minister Willoch's deputy 1985–1986, and state secretary at the Office of the Prime Minister during Lars Korvald's government 1972–1973.

As Prime Minister
Bondevik's first term as Prime Minister lasted from 17 October 1997 to 3 March 2000, in a coalition cabinet consisting of the Christian Democratic Party, the Centre Party and the Liberal Party.

While serving his first term as Prime Minister, Bondevik attracted international attention in August 1998 when he announced that he was suffering from depressive episode, becoming the highest ranking world leader to admit to suffering from a mental illness while in office. Upon this revelation, Anne Enger became acting Prime Minister for three weeks, from 30 August to 23 September, while he recovered from the depressive episode. Bondevik then returned to office. Bondevik received thousands of supportive letters, and said that the experience had been positive overall, both for himself and because it made mental illness more publicly acceptable.

Bondevik's first cabinet resigned after losing a confidence vote in March 2000 as a result of a dispute over the construction of gas-fired power stations and was replaced by a Labour Party government led by Jens Stoltenberg until their defeat in the 2001 parliamentary election. Bondevik then formed his second cabinet, consisting of the Christian Democratic Party, the Conservative Party and the Liberal Party, which took office on 19 October 2001.

The second Bondevik government carried out reforms and left a booming economy; however, Bondevik was defeated in the 2005 parliamentary election, with 81 seats obtained for Bondevik's coalition and its supporters to the opposition Red-Green Coalition's 88.

Bondevik announced his retirement from national-level politics at the end of his term as prime minister, and did not seek re-election for his seat in parliament.

Post-premiership

The Oslo Centre for Peace and Human Rights was founded by Bondevik in January 2006. The purpose of the centre is to work for world peace, human rights and inter-religious tolerance worldwide. The centre cooperates closely with the Carter Center in Atlanta, the Kim Dae Jung Library in Seoul and the Crisis Management Initiative in Helsinki.

On 31 October 2006, he published his memoir, called Et liv i spenning (A life of excitement and tension).

On 31 January 2017, he was the first high-ranking politician from another country detained and questioned in the United States as a result of President Donald Trump's executive orders banning immigration from seven predominantly Muslim nations, because of a diplomatic visit to Iran he had made in 2014.

In 2022, it was revealed that Bondevik had published a glowing appraisal of Kazakhstan in the Norwegian daily newspaper Vårt Land after receiving cash payments from the government of Kazakhstan. Earlier, in 2021, the Norwegian newspaper Dagbladet had revealed that one of Bondevik's colleagues, the Conservative Party politician Aamir J. Sheikh, had requested a cash payment of 704,000 NOK from the government of Bahrain in an e-mail, with Bondevik as one of the carbon-copied (CC) recipients. "A month later, Bondevik and Sheikh handed out an 'honorary prize' to representatives of Bahrain's prime minister," the newspaper wrote.

Awards and decorations
Bondevik was awarded the Grand Cross of St. Olav in 2004, the first sitting Norwegian Prime Minister to receive the Order of St. Olav in 80 years. The award happened due to a change in the Statutes of the Order with automatic awards to the Prime Minister and Ministers of the Government that stirred some debate and criticism. With the succeeding Stoltenberg Government, the practice was halted.

He is a full member of the Club de Madrid, a group of former leaders of democratic states that works to strengthen democratic governance and leadership.

Kjell Magne Bondevik is an Honorary Member of The International Raoul Wallenberg Foundation.

In 2009, Bondevik was awarded an honorary degree from the University of San Francisco.

References

External links
 The Oslo Centre for Peace and Human Rights
 The Royal Norwegian Order of St Olav

1947 births
Living people
Prime Ministers of Norway
Foreign Ministers of Norway
Christian Democratic Party (Norway) politicians
Norwegian priest-politicians
Norwegian state secretaries
Members of the Storting
Recipients of the Order of the Cross of Terra Mariana, 1st Class
People from Molde
21st-century Norwegian politicians
20th-century Norwegian politicians
Ministers of Education of Norway
Special Envoys of the Secretary-General of the United Nations